Prasophyllum caricetum, commonly known as the Cathcart leek orchid, is a species of orchid endemic to a small area of southern New South Wales. It has a single tubular, bright green leaf and up to twenty five green, white and purplish flowers crowded on the flowering stem. It grows in montane swamps near Cathcart.

Description
Between five and twenty five flowers are crowded along the flowering spike. The flowers are green with purplish and white petals and a white labellum. As with others in the genus, the flowers are inverted so that the labellum is above the column rather than below it. The petals are linear in shape and about the same dimensions as the lateral sepals. Flowering occurs from December to February.

Taxonomy and naming
Prasophyllum caricetum was first formally described in 2000 by David Jones from a specimen collected near Cathcart and the description was published in The Orchadian.

Distribution and habitat
This leek orchid grows in swamps with sedges and rush-like members of the family Restionaceae between Cathcart and Majors Creek.

References

External links 
 
 

caricetum
Flora of New South Wales
Endemic orchids of Australia
Plants described in 2000